The Ostriconi is a small coastal river in the department of Haute-Corse, Corsica, France.

Course

It crosses the communes of Lama, Novella, Palasca, Pietralba and Urtaca.

The Ostriconi rises to the east of the village of Pietralba below the  Punta di Paganella and the  Monte Reghia di Pozzo.
It flows west and passes to the south of Pietralba, then flows northwest to the sea.
The T30 road runs parallel to the Ostriconi for most of its length.

Tributaries
The following streams (ruisseaux) are tributaries of the Ostriconi:

 Vadellare 
 Monticellaciu 
 Peraldu 
 Piobetta 
 Scubella 
 Monte Grossu 
 Campotile 
 Cruschininca 
 Chierchiu 
 Manichella 
 Fiume di Gargalagne 
 Fiume a I Peri 
 Salginco 
 Noci 
 Malpruniccia 
 Cava 
 San Giorgio 
 Mezzanello 
 Parghinese 
 Cugnolu 
 l'Ondole 
 Fiume di Cuvertoio 
 Grotta Rossa 
 Funtana Bona 
 Appiatelli 
 e Scale 
 Nuvalicce 
 Compolelli 
 Malculo 
 Bodulo 
 Ravin de l'Ostricone 
 l'Orneto 
 Ponte 
 Furchelle 
 Felicione 
 Ostincaia 
 Villanaccio 
 Valle Tesi 
 Focolaccio 
 Valli 
 Sossa 
 Calasconi

Notes

Sources

Rivers of Haute-Corse
Rivers of France
Coastal basins of the Mediterranean Sea in Corsica